Fay Chong (1912–1973) was a Chinese-American artist and educator, well known for his printmaking and watercolor painting. He was also known for his activities as an arts organizer, arts educator and WPA-era artist. Chong was active in the Pacific Northwest.

Early life and education 
Fay Chong was born in Canton (modern Guangzhou), China in 1912, and moved to Seattle with his family in 1920. He attended public school, and studied art with Hannah Jones at Broadway High School, along with classmates Morris Graves and George Tsutakawa. He studied traditional calligraphy techniques during return visits to China in 1929 and 1935.

Career 
In 1933, Chong, Andrew Chinn, Lawrence Yun, Yippie Eng, and others formed the Chinese Arts Club. Initially an informal co-op, they began holding regular shows at a shared studio in Seattle's International District, and eventually exhibited as an arts collective at the New York Chinese School. Artists Guy Anderson and William Cumming - who, along with Graves and Mark Tobey, would later become prominent members of the 'Northwest School' - were regular guests, joining them on art-making field excursions.

In 1938, during the Great Depression, Morris Graves helped Chong find work as an artist with the Federal Art Project of the Works Project Administration. He worked with the WPA, off and on, until 1942, mainly making linocut prints for various federal buildings and public places. He also became interested in watercolor painting at this time.

After the WPA, Chong worked various jobs, including several years at a YMCA school. In the mid-1950s - already a well-known, nationally exhibited "WPA artist" - he enrolled at the University of Washington, studying under Mark Tobey and others. He earned his B.A. degree in 1968, and M.A. degree at University of Washington in Arts Education in 1971. He taught art at Cornish College of the Arts, Seattle Central College, Washington Senior High School, and Ingraham High School.

His artwork fused traditional Chinese styles with American Regionalism and other modern developments. His later work incorporated elements of Abstract expressionism. His art has been exhibited at the Seattle Art Museum, the Frye Art Museum, the Zoe Dusanne Gallery, and the Francine Seders Gallery in Seattle; the Tacoma Art Museum, the Bellevue Arts Museum, Reed College in Portland, Oregon, the Santa Barbara Museum of Art in California, the Riverside Gallery in New York City, and in many other museums and galleries.

He was a member of the arts organizations Northwest Printmakers (treasurer and president), the Northwest Watercolor Society (president), the Puget Sound Group of Painters, and the Washington Art Association.

Chong was married to artist Priscilla Hwang. The two of them exhibited together at the annual Bellevue Arts and Crafts Fair for many years.

Fay Chong died of a stroke in 1973.

Chong's work is in many public museum art collections, including Smithsonian American Art Museum, National Gallery of Art, Tacoma Art Museum, the Art Institute of Chicago museum, Seattle Arts Museum, among others.

References

Painters from Washington (state)
American artists of Chinese descent
Artists from Seattle
Federal Art Project artists
1912 births
1973 deaths
University of Washington College of Arts and Sciences alumni
Cornish College of the Arts faculty
Chinese emigrants to the United States